The Uruguayan Championship 1911 was the 11th season of Uruguay's top-flight football league.

Overview
The tournament consisted of a two-wheel championship of all against all. It involved eight teams, and the champion was C.U.R.C.C., an institution that earned its fifth and final championship in its history (from the 1914 championship, its place would be taken by the Club Atlético Peñarol).

After accumulating only 7 units at the end of the 14 rounds of the tournament, Libertad had to descend to the Second Division, this being their last appearance in the top flight of Uruguay.

Teams

League standings

References
Uruguay - List of final tables (RSSSF)

Uruguayan Primera División seasons
Uru
1